William Tayloe or Teylow (1645–1710) was the nephew of William Tayloe of King's Creek Plantation and High Sheriff of York County, Virginia, the father of John Tayloe I of The Old House and progenitor of the Tayloes of Mount Airy, Richmond County, Virginia. His coat of arms, Vert a sword erect Or between two lions rampant addorsed Ermine, matches those of Teylow in Gloucester, England.

Family Origins 

The earliest record of the name "Telowe" is from a document dated 1292 during the reign of Edward I regarding a Henry Telowe during an Inquisition of Henry De Dene (de Dene refers to Forest of Dean and later mentioned in de Dene's care is St Briavels Castle, it reads:

"Inquisition made on Monday next after the feast of St. Gregory the Pope, 20 Edw. I [1292] by Richard de Gorstleye, John Geffery, Henry son of Stephen, Henry Telow, Walter son of Nicholas, William de Crickesfend, John de Dene, Nicholas Scharlemayn, Robert son of Genry Glynt, Thomas and Hugh de Biddleslowe, of that land and tenements which Henry de Dene held of the King in chief on the day that he died.."

On 1 August 1420 for a Richard Teylowe, juror for the inquisition of "Joan, Widow of Roger Vynour." On 27 October 1442 a "John Teylowe: chaplain, querents" was party to land transaction in Hereford, England. In 1443 John Teylowe was a juror in the inquisition of Robert Whitney, Knight, dated 4 April. On 3 May 1452, Robert Hychys and his wife Alice release to Philip Teylowe, son of Alice, all of their rights to a piece of land in the parish of Newland near Lamscoy. In 1454-1455 a John Teylowe was an apprentice to Henry Frowyke. In 1466 Agnes Teylowe initiates a Quit-Claim of "Heymedow in Newland, late the relic of Philip Barbour, in pure widowhood, to James Hwett...within the parishes of Newlond and Stanton. This estate, later be known as "High Meadow," would be sold on 7 April 1516 by John Teylowe through a "Feoffment" to Henry Hall  and then to Thomas Gage, 1st Viscount Gage through his marriage to heiress Benedicta Maria Theresa Hall.

There is record of a John Teylowe serving as Mayor in Hereford, England during the latter half of the reign of Edward IV circa 1471, again during the reign of Henry VII circa 1491, and again circa 1496.

The Name Tayloe 
The first record of the name Tayloe is from "The History and Antiquities of Gloucester: From the Earliest Period to the Present Time; Including an Account of the Abbey, Cathedral, and Other Religious Houses, with the Abbots, Bishops, and Dignitaries of Each, Voorkant, Thomas Rudge J. Wood, 1811. Where Thomas  "Tayloe" or Teylowe is recorded as Sheriff of Gloucester under Mayor Philip Pridith during the final days of the 15th Century and again in the early 1500s. A few years later he was Mayor in 1506, 1513 and, 1522.

Early years
After the death of his uncle, William Tayloe, he inherited capital and property on the York and James River.

Career
In 1683 he built "The Old House" on "Tayloe's Quarter" in Old Rappahannock County-now Richmond County, Virginia. On November 23, 1693, Colonel William Tayloe of Richmond County, nephew and heir of Colonel William Tayloe (the immigrant), of King's Creek in York County, deceased, deeds to Lewis Burwell II, 1,200 acres between King's Creek and Queen's Creek on the York River, now Cheatham Annex. With these proceeds William Tayloe (the nephew) enhances original acreage purchases from William Fauntroy land on the north side of the Rappahannock River. The property referred to at first as "Tayloe's Quarter," but later given the name of "Mount Airy."

In 1692 Tayloe was one of the first justices of Richmond County (Richmond Co. was created from Old Rappahannock County in 1692), and in 1704, as "Colonel and Commander in Chief" of the militia of that county, subdued an attempted uprising of the Indians. Colonel Tayloe was a Burgess for Richmond county at the sessions of December 1700; August 1701; May 1702; June 1702, and April 1706. On May 19, 1703, Colonel William Tayloe, Colonel George Taylor, Mr. Samuel Peachey, Captain John Deane, and Captain John Tarpley were justices of Richmond County.

On March 6, 1704/5, William Tayloe, Colonel and Commander-in-chief of Richmond County, on behalf of himself and the Militia within the county, "showeth several charges for services in August and September. Payments to Captain Thomas Beale, Captain John Crooke, Captain William Barber and Captain Henry Prereton their four companies on duty 33 days. Captain John Tarpley and Charles Barber sent out two squadrons of 12 men each under quartermasters. Also claim of William Underwood, Captain of a company of foot Oct 1704; Captain Alexander Donophan, Captain of troop of horse in the upper parts of Richmond County and Captain Nicholas Smith's claim for the troops under his command.
In 1705 Col. William Tayloe, Lieutenant Colonel Samuel Peachey, Maj. William Robinson, Mr. Joshua Davis, Capt. Nicholas Smith, Mr. Edward Barrow and Mr. Francis Slaughter were justices, Richmond County.
In 1706 Col. William Tayloe and Major William Robinson voted their burgesses expenses, each 9,980 pounds tobacco in Richmond County.

On February 7, 1710, at the time of his death, the court ordered the appraisement of his personal estate. Valued at 702.8.8 pounds administration was granted Colonel John Tayloe I, his son.

Personal life
He married Ann Corbin (1664–1694), daughter of Hon. Henry Corbin (ca. 1629–1676) and Alice (Eltonhead) Corbin, of "Buckingham House" Middlesex County, parents of Laetitia Corbin Lee, wife of Col. Richard Lee II, Esq. They had 4 children: Elizabeth, who married John Wormeley; Ann Catherine, who married Samuel Ball; John, who became the chief architect of the family fortune; and William, who married Letitia Wormeley, brother to John – both children of Ralph Wormeley.

References

1645 births
1710 deaths
Tayloe family of Virginia
 Military and militia personnel of the Thirteen Colonies